Rhabdophis rhodomelas, the blueneck keelback or blue-necked keelback, is a species of snake in the subfamily Natricinae of the family Colubridae. It is found in the Malay Peninsula (southern Thailand, Peninsular Malaysia, Singapore), Borneo (Sarawak and Sabah, Malaysia; Kalimantan, Indonesia),  and in the western parts of the Indonesian Archipelago (Sumatra, Java, Bangka Island).

It is oviparous, with fecundity up to 27 eggs.

References 

rhodomelas
Snakes of Southeast Asia
Reptiles of the Malay Peninsula
Reptiles of Borneo
Snakes of Indonesia
Snakes of Malaysia
Snakes of Singapore
Snakes of Thailand
Reptiles described in 1827
Taxa named by Heinrich Boie